Lazar Jovanović (born 13 July 1993) is a Serbian professional footballer who plays as a forward.

Club career
Born in Užice, Jovanović went through the youth system at local clubs Jedinstvo and Sloboda, making his senior debut with the latter in March 2012. He subsequently played for Mladost Lučani, before joining Borac Čačak during the 2016 winter transfer window. In the 2016–17 Serbian SuperLiga, Jovanović was the team's top scorer with eight goals from 34 appearances, helping the side narrowly avoid relegation.

International career
Jovanović made his international debut for Serbia under Slavoljub Muslin, coming on as a late second-half substitute for Srđan Plavšić in a goalless draw against the United States in San Diego on 29 January 2017.

References

External links
 
 

1993 births
Living people
Serbian footballers
Sportspeople from Užice
FK Borac Čačak players
FK Mladost Lučani players
FK Sloboda Užice players
FC Pyunik players
FK Radnički Niš players
Maccabi Bnei Reineh F.C. players
Serbian First League players
Serbian SuperLiga players
Armenian Premier League players
Israeli Premier League players
Serbia international footballers
Serbian expatriate footballers
Expatriate footballers in Armenia
Expatriate footballers in Israel
Serbian expatriate sportspeople in Armenia
Serbian expatriate sportspeople in Israel
Association football forwards